Joint Expeditionary Force could refer to:

UK Joint Expeditionary Force, a United Kingdom-led expeditionary force of 10 Northern European countries, from 2014
Joint Expeditionary Force (Maritime), the Royal Navy's contribution to the above force, from 2010
Combined Joint Expeditionary Force, a combined Anglo-French expeditionary force, from 2010